Bikramgarh is a neighbourhood located of the southern part of Kolkata, in West Bengal, India. The neighbourhood shares its boundary with Jadavpur, Katju Nagar, South City, Golf Green and Tollygunge.

References

Neighbourhoods in Kolkata